Delacour is a hamlet in southern Alberta under the jurisdiction of Rocky View County. The hamlet features a creek valley setting and a golf club.

History 

The Delacour station was named after the foreman of the Grand Trunk Pacific Railway construction crew. The line became part of the Canadian National Railway in 1914. It was previously believed that Delacour was a French name meaning "of the heart". It has been revealed that Mr. Delacour was from Denmark. The first passenger train went through February 28, 1914. A small store was established in the community in 1914. The post office was in operation since November 15, 1915.

Demographics 

The population of Delacour according to the 2018 municipal census conducted by Rocky View County is 10.

See also 
List of communities in Alberta
List of hamlets in Alberta

References 

Karamitsanis, Aphrodite (1992). Place Names of Alberta – Volume II, Southern Alberta, University of Calgary Press, Calgary, Alberta.
Read, Tracey (1983). Acres and Empires – A History of the Municipal District of Rocky View, Calgary, Alberta.

Calgary Region
Designated places in Alberta
Hamlets in Alberta
Rocky View County